Prof. Karl Olov Hedberg (19 October 1923 – 24 September 2007)
of Västerås
was a botanist, taxonomist, author, professor of systematic botany at Uppsala University from 1970 to 1989, and an Editor of the Flora of Ethiopia.

Career 
Professor Hedberg was a pioneer in scientific knowledge on the afroalpine vegetation. Our present knowledge of this biosystem owes much to the research he and his wife Inga did on the Rwenzori and other high mountains in East Africa. His breakthrough views were based on their systematic fieldwork in the late 1940s. 'Features of Afroalpine Plant Ecology' remains a landmark in equatorial alpine ecological research up till today, and is still available in a facsimile re-edition of 1995.

In 1981, he was elected as a member of the Royal Swedish Academy of Sciences. He was recognised as a doctor jubilaris at the Linnean Doctoral Promotion at Uppsala University 2007. He was updating the Umbelliferae manuscript (prepared by Vernon Heywood, Stephen Jury and others) when he died in 2007.

Herbaria 
He was a member of the British Mycological Society. He was a contributor to the herbaria of the Natural History Museum (BM), the National Botanic Garden of Belgium (BR), National Museums of Kenya (East African Herbarium), National Herbarium (Ethiopia), Royal Botanic Gardens, Kew (K), Muséum National d'Histoire Naturelle (P) and the Swedish Museum of Natural History Department of Phanerogamic Botany (S).
He was considered to be an important collector for the botany section of the Museum of Evolution at Uppsala University, Sweden
having contributed to the phanerogamic part of the museum.

Personal life 
Professor Hedberg and his wife Inga (also a botanist) had five children: Per, Bengt, Göran, Björn and Maria.

Taxonomic patronyms
In honor of K. O. Hedberg, several taxonomic patronyms were given in plants.
 Hedbergia
 Asystasia hedbergii
 Bryum hedbergii
 Calamagrostis hedbergii
 Colpodium hedbergii
 Crassula hedbergii
 Koenigia hedbergii
 Licania hedbergii
 Microcyba hedbergi
 Senecio hedbergii

References

1923 births
2007 deaths
Botanists active in Kew Gardens
Botanists active in Africa
Swedish botanists
Members of the Royal Swedish Academy of Sciences